Lenifusus is a genus of sea snails, marine gastropod molluscs in the family Melongenidae, the crown conches and their allies.

Species
Species within the genus Lenifusus include:
 Lenifusus elongatus (Lamarck, 1822)

References

 Dekkers A. (2018). Two new genera in the family Melongenidae from the Indo-Pacific and comments on the identity of Hemifusus zhangyii Kosuge, 2008 and Pyrula elongata Lamarck, 1822 (Gastropoda, Neogastropoda: Buccinoidea). Gloria Maris. 57(2): 40-50

Melongenidae